Lugouqiao Subdistrict, formerly Lugouqiao Township, is a subdistrict located at the northern end of Fengtai District, Beijing, China. It borders Lugu, Babaoshan, Taipingqiao and Guang'anmenwai Subdistricts to the north, You'anmen Subdistrict to the east, Xincun Subdistrict, Huaxiang and Wanpingcheng Townships to the south, Changxindian Town and Lugu Subdistrict to the west. It has a population of 112,087 within its administrative area as of the 2020 census.

The subdistrict's name, is the native Chinese name for Marco Polo Bridge, located at Yongding River on the southwest part of the subdistrict.

History

Administrative Division 
In 2021, Lugouqiao Subdistrict has direct jurisdiction over 17 subdivisions, including 11 communities and 6 villages:

Landmark 

 Marco Polo Bridge

See also 

 List of township-level divisions of Beijing

References 

Fengtai District
Subdistricts of Beijing